The Correja was an American automobile produced from 1908 to 1915.  Built by Vandewater & Co. of Iselin, New Jersey, the car was a shaft-driven 40 hp four of 5808 cc.

References
David Burgess Wise, The New Illustrated Encyclopedia of Automobiles.

Defunct motor vehicle manufacturers of the United States
Defunct companies based in New Jersey
Manufacturing companies based in New Jersey